Ronen Bergman (born June 16, 1972) is an Israeli investigative journalist and author. He is a senior political and military analyst for Yedioth Ahronoth, Israel's largest-circulation daily.

Bergman has written for The New York Times, where he is a staff writer for The New York Times Magazine, the Wall Street Journal, Foreign Affairs, and Newsweek in the United States, and for The Times, The Guardian, the Frankfurter Allgemeine Zeitung, and the Sueddeutsche Zeitung in Europe. He is also interviewed frequently by the media in the United States and Europe, and his work is often quoted in Middle Eastern newspapers in Arabic and Persian.

He has published four books in Hebrew, which topped Israeli non-fiction best-seller lists. His books cover corruption in the Palestinian Authority, the 1973 Yom Kippur War, the Iranian nuclear project, and Israeli POWs and MIAs.

A translation of his third book, The Secret War with Iran, was published by Simon & Schuster in 2008. The book appeared in the Boston Globe’s recommended reading list for summer 2009.

Bergman lectures frequently to academic and military audiences, as well as to the general public. He has been a guest lecturer at academic forums at major universities in Israel and abroad, including Princeton, Yale, Columbia, New York University, Oxford, and Cambridge, and at military and intelligence forums in Israel, the United States and England.

Biography
Bergman was born in 1972, and grew up in Kiryat Bialik. His mother was a teacher and his father was an accountant. He is the youngest of three children. As a boy, he was a reporter for a youth television show. His parents were both Holocaust survivors.

He did his military service in the Israel Defense Forces in the intelligence unit of the Military Police Corps. After his military service, he studied law at the University of Haifa, graduated cum laude, and was admitted to the Israel Bar Association. He later studied history and international relations at Corpus Christi College, Cambridge in the United Kingdom, and was awarded an M.Phil. degree in international relations and a PhD (for his dissertation on the Israeli Mossad) by the University of Cambridge.

He is a member of the Körber Foundation "Munich Young Leaders 2010" and participated in the 46th Munich Security Conference.

He is a former senior staff feature writer for Haaretz.

Bergman is the recipient of the 1995 Bnai Brith Worlds Center Award for Journalism and the 1996 Ha’aretz award for Best Story.

In 2017 he won the Sokolov Prize.
In the same year he won the Rotary Paul Harris prize.

Published works

Bergman's articles  are often based on classified military and intelligence material to which he has been granted exclusive access. Over the years, he has brought to light numerous issues of considerable public interest, including: the diversion of Palestinian tax revenues to the personal bank account of Yassir Arafat; the production of fertilizer from the bones of Holocaust victims at an Italian factory during World War II; the sale by an Israeli businessman of dual-use chemical raw materials and technology to Iran; the medical file of Prime Minister Rabin compiled on the night of his assassination; the case of “Agent Babylon,” the aide to Egyptian President Sadat who was an Israeli spy; the first interviews ever published with members of the Mossad's special ops unit; medical experiments conducted on Israeli soldiers as part of joint U.S.-Israeli efforts to develop a vaccine against anthrax; and various institutional corruption scandals in Israel.

Books
And The Authority Is Given (2002)
Moment of Truth (2003)
Point Of No Return (2007)
The Secret War With Iran (2008)
By Any Means Necessary (2009)
Ha-Bor (The Pit) (2011) with Dan Margalit
Operation Red Falcon (2015)
Rise and Kill First: The Secret History of Israel's Targeted Assassinations (Jan 23, 2018)

Awards 

 2018: National Jewish Book Awards in the History category for Rise and Kill First: The Secret History of Israel's Targeted Assassinations

References

Further reading
 Official website
 Ronen Bergman, The Secret War with Iran
 Ronen Bergman, Living to Bomb Another Day, The New York Times, September 9, 2008

Israeli journalists
Israeli television presenters
People from Kiryat Bialik
Academic staff of Tel Aviv University
Israeli people of Polish-Jewish descent
Alumni of Corpus Christi College, Cambridge
Living people
1972 births
Israeli non-fiction writers
University of Haifa alumni
Yedioth Ahronoth people